"Storybook" is the eighth studio album by Australian singer-songwriter Kasey Chambers. "Storybook" is a collection of some of Kasey's favourite artists, musicians that have inspired and influenced her throughout her career and acts as a companion to her autobiography, A Little Bird Told Me.

It was released on 23 September 2011 and peaked at No.21 in Australia.

Review
Hal Horowitz from All Music gave the album 3.5 out of 5, saying; "Chambers invests her girlish yet poignant vocals and the playing is consistently excellent. If you are already a fan, it's an agreeable venture, but she's not bringing much new to the table in terms of arrangements or her vocal approach. That doesn't make this any less genuine or heartfelt in terms of Chambers' often poignant commitment; however, it also seems like a missed opportunity to stamp these songs with her own personality by re-imagining them to reveal fresh or previously unrealised sub texts."

Jason Hamad from No Surf Music said; "Lacking any original material, it’s impossible to say that Storybook is a 'can’t miss' album, but for Kasey Chambers fans it has the potential to be extremely informative. Although there are a few misses, with highlights like 'Happy Woman Blues', 'Return of the Grievous Angel', 'Leave the Lights On', 'Guilty', 'Orphan Girl' and 'Too Long in the Wasteland' it’s more than an enjoyable listen."

Track listing

Charts

Weekly charts

Year-end charts

References

Kasey Chambers albums
Covers albums
2011 albums